Beni Mazar is a rural town in Egypt. It is located in the Minya Governorate, on the west bank of the Nile. The older name of the town is Shinwada ( or شِنُوَدة) which comes from Sahidic  (Bohairic: ϣⲓⲛⲟⲩⲟϯ) meaning "kailyard"..

See also

 List of cities and towns in Egypt

References 

Populated places in Minya Governorate